Jack Milne may refer to:
 Jack Milne (speedway rider)
 Jack Milne Cup
 Jack Milne (footballer)

See also
 John Milne (disambiguation)